Chubrovka is a rural locality (a village) in Yesipovskoye Rural Settlement, Ternovsky District, Voronezh Oblast, Russia. The population was 131 as of 2010.

Geography 
Chubrovka is located 19 km northwest of Ternovka (the district's administrative centre) by road. Yesipovo is the nearest rural locality.

References 

Rural localities in Ternovsky District